The 1951 Omloop Het Volk was the seventh edition of the Omloop Het Volk cycle race and was held on 11 March 1951. The race started and finished in Ghent. The race was won by Jean Bogaerts.

General classification

References

1951
Omloop Het Nieuwsblad
Omloop Het Nieuwsblad